Pseudocanthon is a genus of (formerly canthonini) in the beetle family Scarabaeidae. There are about nine described species in Pseudocanthon.

Species
These nine species belong to the genus Pseudocanthon:
 Pseudocanthon caeranus Matthews, 1966
 Pseudocanthon chlorizans (Bates, 1887)
 Pseudocanthon iuanalaoi Matthews, 1966
 Pseudocanthon ivanalaoi Matthews
 Pseudocanthon jamaicensis Matthews, 1966
 Pseudocanthon perplexus (LeConte, 1847) (four-toothed dung beetle)
 Pseudocanthon sylvaticus Matthews, 1966
 Pseudocanthon vitraci (Fleutiaux & Sallé, 1889)
 Pseudocanthon xanthurus (Blanchard, 1846)

References

Further reading

External links

 

Deltochilini
Articles created by Qbugbot